Nguyễn Thị Lụa (born 1990 ; living in Hanoi) is a female Vietnamese wrestler.  In 2009 and 2011, the SEA Games were held by Laos and Indonesia, however the Women's freestyle -48 kg did not take place, because most of the countries had not brought their wrestlers to SEA Games with the exception of Vietnam.

She is the first Vietnamese wrestler to qualify for the Olympics since the return of Vietnam to the Olympics in 1992.  She competed in the women's 48 kg freestyle at the 2012 Summer Olympics.  At the 2016 Summer Olympics she competed in the women's 53 kg freestyle.

References

External links
 

Vietnamese female sport wrestlers
1990 births
Living people
Wrestlers at the 2012 Summer Olympics
Wrestlers at the 2016 Summer Olympics
Sportspeople from Hanoi
Olympic wrestlers of Vietnam
Asian Games medalists in wrestling
Wrestlers at the 2010 Asian Games
Wrestlers at the 2014 Asian Games
Asian Games silver medalists for Vietnam
Medalists at the 2010 Asian Games
21st-century Vietnamese women